The  are a mountain range straddling the border between Gifu and Shiga prefectures in Japan. After lowering and nearly disappearing in Shiga Prefecture, the range continues as the Suzuka Mountains. During the winter, the winds from the Ibuki Mountains are a cause of much of the snowfall on the Nōbi Plain covering Gifu and Aichi prefectures. The Ane River originates in the Ibuki Mountains.

The range is named after Mount Ibuki, the highest peak in the range at an elevation of 1377 meters above sea-level. Mount Kinka, Mount Dodo, Mount Kanmuri, and Mount Dainichi are some other notable peaks in the range.

Mount Ibuki is a popular destination among climbers and hikers. The mountain's base is easily reachable by private or public transportation. To the west of the mountain is another interesting place, Biwa lake.

Peaks
Mount Ibuki, 
Mount Ikeda, 
Mount Kanakuso (金糞岳 Kanakuso-dake), 
Mount Kaitsuki (貝月岳 Kaitsuki-dake), 
Mount Kunimi (国見岳 Kunimi-dake),

See also
Geography of Japan

References

Mountain ranges of Gifu Prefecture
Mountain ranges of Shiga Prefecture